Chaeteessidae is a family of praying mantises. It contains a single extant genus, Chaeteessa, native to South America which is thought to be the most primitive and earliest diverging lineage of living mantises. Fossil genera are known from the Paleogene of Eurasia and North America.

Fossil genera 

 †Arvernineura Piton 1940 Menat Formation, France, Paleocene (Selandian)
 †Louispitonia Schubnel and Nel 2019 (=Archaeophlebia Piton 1940) Menat Formation, France, Paleocene (Selandian)
 †Lithophotina Cockerell 1908 Florissant Formation, Colorado, United States, Eocene
 †Megaphotina Gratshev and Zherikhin 1993 Bol'shaya Svetlovodnaya, Primorsky, Russia, Eocene

Indeterminate species are also known from French Oise amber, dating to the Eocene (Ypresian)

See also
List of mantis genera and species

References

Mantodea
Mantodea families